The ashy-breasted flycatcher (Muscicapa randi) is a species of bird in the family Muscicapidae.
It is endemic to the Philippines found only on the islands of Negros and Luzon. Its natural habitat is  tropical moist lowland forests. It is threatened by habitat loss.

Description 
EBird describes the bird as "A little-known small drab bird of lowland and foothill forest. Gray-brown above, darker in the wing, with a gray-brown chest blending to a white belly and a small white throat patch. Note the bicolored bill, black above and orange below. Similar to Furtive Flycatcher, but slightly larger, with an orange lower bill, no rufous outer tail feathers, and no black band on the end of the tail. Song consists of very high-pitched short phrases repeated at intervals. "

Habitat and Conservation Status 
It inhabits primary and secondary growth forest up to 1,000 meters above sea level. It exhibits some tolerance to habitat degradation being recorded in clearings. It is often found perching on exposed branches near the canopy. Birds caught in August and September at Dalton Pass, Luzon, suggest that it may undertake intra-island movements, but possibly little more than post-breeding dispersal.

It has been assessed as vulnerable with a population currently between 6,000 and 15,000 and believed to be declining.  In 1988, it was estimated that as little as 4% of original forest remained on Negros, 24% on Luzon with these figures continuing to decline. This species' main threat is habitat loss with wholesale clearance of forest habitats as a result of legal and illegal logging, agricultural conversion and mining activities occurring within the range. In 1988, it was estimated that as little as 4% of original forest remained on Negros, 24% on Luzon with these figures continuing to decline. 

It has been recorded in a few protected areas including Mount Makiling National Park and Northern Sierra Madre Natural Park, however like most areas in the country, protection against deforestation and hunting is lax. It has also been found in the proposed area of Balinsasayao Twin Lakes Natural Park which has received conservation funding. 

Conservation actions proposed include to re-examine museum specimens of Muscicapa flycatchers from the Philippines to check identification, in order to resolve its anomalous distribution. Survey to further investigate its true distribution and population. Extend the Northern Sierra Madre Natural Park and improve enforcement. Afford formal protection to Balinsasayao Twin Lakes Natural Park.

References

External links

ashy-breasted flycatcher
Endemic birds of the Philippines
ashy-breasted flycatcher
ashy-breasted flycatcher
Taxonomy articles created by Polbot